Billy Dean Burlison (March 15, 1931 – March 17, 2019) was an American politician who held office in the states of Missouri and Maryland.

Biography
Burlison, the son of John Ivy "J.I." and Lillie (née Marler) Burlison, was born and died in Wardell, Missouri. He attended Southeast Missouri State University and earned his law degree from the University of Missouri. Burlison was admitted to practice law in the District of Columbia, Maryland, and Missouri courts. He served in the United States Marine Corps. Burlison was a Democrat. He represented Missouri as a member of the U. S. Congress starting with the Ninety-first United States Congress in 1969 until he was defeated in a bid for a seventh-term by Bill Emerson in 1980.

He moved to Maryland shortly after his congressional defeat. Burlison was an unsuccessful candidate for the Maryland House of Delegates in 1986 and 1990. He was elected to the County Council of Anne Arundel County, Maryland County Council in 1998 and re-elected to a second and final term in 2002. Four months after entering the race for Congress in the 3rd District in the 2006 election, he withdrew his candidacy on November 3, 2005.

After Burlison returned to his native Missouri, he settled in Advance, Missouri, he ran for election to the 159th Missouri legislative district in 2008 and 2010. He lost overwhelmingly both times to Billy Pat Wright. Campaign literature states that he was Southeast Missouri State University student body president in 1952, was a former marine, and was the only person in the country with 7 academic degrees. Burlison moved to his birthplace of Wardell, Missouri, to run for the 149th district in 2014 as state representative Steve Hodges was facing a term limit. He lost to Republican Don Rone, 2,770 (42.15%) to 3,802 (57.85%).

On February 23, 2016, he filed to run for the Missouri Senate against incumbent Republican Doug Libla, and was unopposed in the Democratic primary. On November 8, 2016, Libla won re-election with 69.35% of the vote.

Burlison married Barbara Humphreys in 1955; they had three children and divorced in 1983. He then married Michael Sue Mickey Prosser in 1995, and they remained married until his death. Burlison died on March 17, 2019, at the age of 88.

References

External links
Bill D. Burlison County Council Bio
Burlison Biography from Congressional Bioguide
County Councilman Burlison runs again for Congress, Annapolis Capital, 7/6/2005

1931 births
2019 deaths
American prosecutors
Democratic Party members of the United States House of Representatives from Missouri
Maryland Democrats
Maryland lawyers
Members of Anne Arundel County Council
Military personnel from Missouri
Missouri lawyers
People from Pemiscot County, Missouri
People from Stoddard County, Missouri
Southeast Missouri State University alumni
United States Marines
University of Missouri alumni
20th-century American lawyers